Poet and the Roots are a reggae band formed to record dub poet Linton Kwesi Johnson's poems with dub backing tracks.

The recordings were on the Virgin Records label. Johnson released his later material under his own name, although some of the musicians from this group appeared on his subsequent albums.

Discography

Album 
Dread Beat an' Blood, Virgin Records, 1978

Singles 
 "All Wi Doin' Is Defendin'", Virgin Records, 1977
 "It Dread Inna Inglan (For George Lindo)", Virgin Records, 1978

References

British reggae musical groups
Musical groups from London